Îles Ehotilé National Park is a national park of the Ivory Coast in the Sud-Comoé region. The park consists of a group of low islands and the intervening channels that separate Aby Lagoon from the Atlantic Ocean.

The national park was established in 1974 on the initiative of the local communities who wished to protect their historical sites. The Ehotile Islands were designated a Ramsar site in 2005 under the name Îles Ehotilé-Essouman, and a proposal was submitted to UNESCO for consideration of the site as a World Heritage Site in 2006. The archaeological and historical sites on the islands are also protected.

Physical geography 
The archipelago consists of six islands (Assokomonobaha, Balouate, Meha, Nyamouan, Elouamin, and the sacred island Bosson Assoun) in the estuarine area.

Flora and fauna

Flora 
The vegetation of the islands is very varied for such a small area; the coastal zone is mostly dominated by mangroves, and the interior is largely tropical forest with a dense understory.

Birds 
128 species of birds in 35 families have been recorded here. Most of these are aquatic species, and in the dry season migratory species also visit the park. Resident species include the little grebe, African darter, reed cormorant, cattle egret, squacco heron, striated heron, western reef heron, black-crowned night heron, woolly-necked stork, and white-faced whistling duck.

Mammals 
The park is also home to mammals typically inhabiting forest zones, such as duikers and bushpigs, as well as two species that give the park its uniqueness: one of these is the manatee, an aquatic mammal characteristic of the Ivorian lagoons; the other is the colony of straw-coloured fruit bats that roosts on Balouate Island, which the local people believe to be a sign of the presence of their ancestors. Additionally, there are a great variety of other bats, and the islands are home to the spotted-necked otter and the African clawless otter.

Human activity 
The population bordering the park is divided between 21 villages and is officially estimated at 32,103 people, or 32% of the total population of the department. Tourism is the only occupation permitted on the islands, and fishing is the main activity outside the protected area.

References 

National parks of Ivory Coast
Islands of Ivory Coast
Sud-Comoé
Ramsar sites in Ivory Coast